Hsu Tsang-Houei (September 6, 1929 - January 1, 2001) was a Taiwanese musician and music educator. As an ethnomusicologist, he has been called a "pioneering collector of Taiwanese folk songs."

Early life and education 
Hsu was born in Hemei Village, Changhua County, Taichung, Taiwan in the period of Japanese occupation, and went to Japan to study at the age of 12, majoring in violin. He came back to Taiwan and studied at Taichung Municipal Taichung First Senior High School in 1946 after war, and then studied at Taiwan Provincial Normal College (now National Taiwan Normal University) department of music, serving as a violinist at Taiwan Provincial Symphony Orchestra (now National Taiwan Symphony Orchestra) after graduating.

Hsu went to France to study at public expense in 1954, and attended the College of Frankfurt, after that he transferred to University of Paris (Université de Paris), majoring in composition and studying under André Jolivet. In 1959, he chose the poem “Yesterday Someone Came from the Sea” and composed it into a soprano solo piece, which was selected for the competition of the Italian Modern Music Society, and then began his composing career.

Career 
Hsu was back to Taiwan in 1959. Besides music composing, he also collected local music cultural works, for example, Taiwanese folk songs. Furthermore, Hsu used the way of Western composing methods to rewrite traditional Chinese music, such as the Cantata "Song of Burial Flowers" written from A Dream of Red Mansions; as well as the opera from The Legend of the White Snake, and the Baijiachun Concerto which were well-known and well received. Hsu was influenced by Béla Bartók's use of folk music, as well as Antonín Dvořák's embrace of nationalism.

In addition to composing music, Hsu formed many modern music groups, and devoted himself to the education of modern music and the preservation of folk music. He once teamed up with Deng Chang-Guo, Anna Azusa Fujita and Zhang Ji-Gao to found the "New Music in First Play" orchestra, introducing Western modern music performances. Other important music groups such as "Asian Composers League" also have his participation and contribution.

Hsu taught multiple generations of students in the field of Taiwanese folk music and introduced the indigenous music of Taiwan to an international audience. In 1988, he took a group of indigenous artists on a tour of European countries including France, Switzerland, Germany and the Netherlands. Among the performers were Amis husband and wife duo Difang and Igay Duana, whose vocal performance were famously recorded and used without their permission as a centerpiece of the popular song "Return to Innocence" by the new age band Enigma. They would later settle with Enigma for an undisclosed amount of money.

References

External links 
 National Taiwan Normal University profile

Taiwanese musicians
National Taiwan Normal University alumni
1929 births
2001 deaths